Magdalena Agnes Lamm (7 June 1914–25 August 1996), better known by her pseudonym Agi, was a Hungarian-Argentinian illustrator, artist and craftsperson. After fleeing from racial prejudice in Austria, she settled in Argentina in 1940, where she worked as an illustrator for various Buenos Aires publishers.

Life and career
Magdalena Agnes Lamm was born on 7 June 1914 in Budapest, Hungary. Her parents were well-off and owned land, and she grew up on the puszta—the plains in Hungary—as an only child. Lamm was of Jewish descent.

Lamm's family moved out of the plains and into Budapest in the mid 1920s. She briefly attended a girls' boarding school in Budapest, before she moved to Belgrade, Yugoslavia, where she lived with her mother in the late 1920s. Between 1930 and 1932, she began attending Vienna’s Kunstgewerbeschule (Arts and Crafts School). At the school, she studied fashion design and took classes under artist Eduard Josef Wimmer-Wisgrill. She later worked as a set designer in Vienna, designing for literary cabarets.

In 1938, she left Austria and fled to France due to her "fear of racial harassment". She lived in exile for two years; in 1939, she moved to Bolivia, before finally arriving in Argentina in 1940. She settled down in Argentina and became a book illustrator in Buenos Aires, drawing under the pseudonym "Agi". She illustrated for the music publisher Ricordi and later the publisher .

In 1945, she won first prize at the Festival Nacional Infantil, for illustrations in La Sirenita by Hans Christian Andersen. In 1950, she began illustrating for the book series "Colección Yo soy", working alongside Susi Hochstimm.

Later in her life, Lamm developed Parkinson’s disease. She was unable to continue making art with the disorder, and died in Buenos Aires on 25 August 1996.

Works

Illustrated music arrangements
 Canciones de Navidad (1940) - compiled and transcribed by Rita Kurzmann Leuchter
 Cattciones infantiles Europeas (1941) - compiled by Rita Kurzmann Leuchter
 El pequeno violinista (1943) - written by Ljerko Spiller

Children’s books
La Sirenetta - written by Hans Christian Andersen, with an unknown translator
 Una aventura entre las flores (c. 1946) - written and illustrated by Agi
 Hansel y Gretel (1948) - written by Grimm and adapted by Α. Mar
 El senor ano tiene cuatro casitas (1948) - written by Noñé
 Yo soy la familia Quiquiriqui (c. 1949) - written and illustrated by Agi; part of series "Yo soy."
 A la ronda, ronda... (1950) - written by Gorito
 Los 7 cabritos (1950) - written by Grimm
 Yo soy el indiecito (c. 1950) - written by Susi; part of series "Yo soy."
 Yo soy el osito de juguete (c. 1950) - written by Susi; part of series "Yo soy."

References

1914 births
1996 deaths
Argentine illustrators
Argentine women illustrators
Argentine children's book illustrators
20th-century Hungarian artists
20th-century Hungarian women artists
Pseudonymous artists
Hungarian emigrants to Argentina